Yang Tinghe (15 October 1459 – 25 July 1529), style name Jiefu, was a Grand Secretary in the Ming dynasty under the Zhengde (Wuzong) and Jiajing (Shizong) emperors. Yang was born and died in Xindu, Sichuan province, China.

Biography
Yang Tinghe earned the Jinshi degree in the imperial examination in 1478 at the age of 19.

After the death of the Zhengde Emperor in 1521, Yang became the de facto policymaker of the imperial government for 37 days. He conducted a series of reforms in these 37 days, abolished many unpopular legacies of Wuzong, including the arrest of his favorite, general Jiang Bin. Yang played an important role in choosing the young Zhu Houcong (then Prince Xing and a  cousin of the late Zhengde) as the next emperor.

After Zhu Houcong was brought to Beijing from his parents' estate in the  Hubei countryside and enthroned as the Jiajing Emperor, Yang Tinghe tried to continue his influence in the court, given the young age of the new emperor. However, the Grand Secretary disagreed with the emperor as to whom the latter should venerate as his dead father. Yang Tinghe was forced to retire after his political failure during this so-called Great rites controversy in 1524.

Family
The poets Yang Shen and Huang E were Yang Tinghe's son and daughter-in-law.

See also
 List of Premiers of China
 Grand Secretary

References

Politicians from Chengdu
1459 births
1529 deaths
Writers from Chengdu
Senior Grand Secretaries of the Ming dynasty
Ming dynasty historians
Historians from Sichuan
15th-century Chinese historians
16th-century Chinese historians